Bamboo Blade (stylized as BAMBOO BLADE) is a Japanese manga series written by Masahiro Totsuka and illustrated by Aguri Igarashi. It was serialized in Square Enix's Young Gangan magazine from December 2004 to September 2010. The series tells the story of Toraji Ishida, a luckless high school Kendo instructor, who is challenged by his former upperclassman, also a kendo instructor, to a competition between their female students. The bet inspires Toraji to gather and train a team of five girls, where he meets Tamaki Kawazoe, a gifted young female kendo practitioner.

An anime adaptation by AIC A.S.T.A was broadcast in Japan between October 2007 and April 2008 on TV Tokyo. The Bamboo Blade manga has been licensed for distribution in North America by Yen Press. The anime has been licensed for distribution in North America by Funimation and began airing on their Funimation Channel on October 25, 2010.

Characters

Some of the character's names are based on real professional kendo practitioners. Ishida Toraji is based on the famous kendoka Toshiya Ishida. Miyako Miyazaki is based on Masahiro Miyazaki, and Danjuro Eiga is based on Naoki Eiga, Kirino Chiba is based on Masashi Chiba etc., even though there are not any relations between the Bamboo Blade characters in regards to the real kendoka. Eiga Dan is the only exception, as he seems to be designed to represent Naoki Eiga, who also is not very tall, just like Eiga.

Anime episodes

Video game
A video game titled "Bamboo Blade: Sorekara no Chousen" was released for PSP. It is an Action game that was developed and published by Gadget Soft. It was released in Japan in 2009.

Reception
"The recent series from anime production house AIC A.S.T.A is a surprise - and yet not really one at all," wrote Andrez Bergen in the June 2008 issue of U.K. magazine, impact. "While Bamboo Blade follows the travails of a bunch of high school girls in one very special kendo team, rather than boys, the producers were previously responsible for Gun Sword, a series in which one very special woman - Carmen 99 - also pretty much stole the show."

See also
 List of Square Enix video game franchises

Notes

References

Further reading

External links
 Manga
 Manga official website 
 
 Manga Life review

 Anime
 Anime official website 
 AIC A.S.T.A's website for the anime 
 TV Tokyo's website for the anime 
 Funimation official Bamboo Blade website

Anime International Company
Funimation
Gangan Comics manga
Kendo in anime and manga
Seinen manga
Square Enix franchises
Yen Press titles